Minneapolis hardcore is regional hardcore punk from the Minneapolis-St. Paul area of Minnesota.

See also
List of Minneapolis hardcore bands

Venues 
 The Triple Rock Social Club, a popular hardcore venue in Minneapolis. It was owned by some of the members of Dillinger Four. It closed in 2017. 
 NOFX's 2006 single "Seeing Double at the Triple Rock", from the Wolves in Wolves' Clothing album, is a tribute to the Triple Rock club where they also filmed the video for the song.
 The Beat Coffeehouse
 Memory Lanes Punk Rock Bowling
 The Hexagon Bar
 Station4

DIY 
The Minneapolis hardcore and punk scene has a strong DIY ethic. Accomplishments have included community-sponsored venues to basement shows to an all-volunteer independent record store Extreme Noise Records.

Record labels 
 Havoc Records
 Profane Existence
 Organize and Arise
Neglected Records

References

External links
Twin Cities Hardcore
Twin cities hardcore journal zine/tv show/websource
Urban Decay #2- 1985 punk zine (PDF)
Urban Decay #3- 1985 punk zine (PDF)
Twin Cities Punk Message Board
TCSP
The Minnewiki, a wiki of Minnesota music, featuring articles on dozens of Minneapolis hardcore and punk bands
Post-funk rock rebels thrive in Minneapolis. New York Times. October 27, 1985.
New Moon Rising: The Return of Eclipse Records. Pulse of the Twin Cities March 22, 2007.
Organize and Arise! Minneapolis based punk and hardcore DIY forum
Goofy's Upper Deck Facebook group Facebook group dedicated to the history of Goofy's Upper Deck
KITTEN 1999 NOTES Terry Katzman's notes on the 1999 Kitten Compilation reissue CD

Hardcore punk
Minneapolis–Saint Paul
Music scenes